Amelia Bergner (1853–1923) was an American photographer. Bergner is known for her photograms of leaves and botanical subjects, created in the 1870s.

Her work is included in the collections of the Musée d'Orsay, Paris, the Snite Museum of Art, the Museum of Fine Arts Houston, the Art Institute of Chicago, the San Francisco Museum of Modern Art, the Philadelphia Museum of Art, and the Nelson-Atkins Museum of Art.

References

1853 births
1923 deaths
19th-century American photographers
20th-century American photographers
19th-century American women artists
20th-century American women artists